Felix Muskett Morley (January 6, 1894 – March 13, 1982) was a Pulitzer Prize-winning journalist and college administrator from the United States.

Biography
Morley was born in Haverford, Pennsylvania, his father being the mathematician Frank Morley. Like his brothers, Christopher and Frank, Felix was educated at Haverford College and earned a Rhodes Scholarship to University of Oxford in England. He earned a Guggenheim Fellowship to study the League of Nations in Geneva, Switzerland, which resulted in his book The Society of Nations (1933) and a Ph.D. from the Brookings Institution. Morley was raised within and remained a member of the  Religious Society of Friends or Quakers.

From 1933 to 1940, Morley worked as editor for The Washington Post, winning, in 1936, the paper's first Pulitzer Prize, for his "distinguished editorial writing during the year." The Pulitzer Prize  came after the Franklin D. Roosevelt's National Industrial Recovery Act was nullified by the U.S. Supreme Court. Morley had written that Roosevelt "turned his back on the traditions and principles of his party and gave tremendous support stimulus to the move for a complete political realignment in the United States."

In 1940, Morley left journalism to succeed William Wistar Comfort as President of Haverford College.  He also supported Wendell Willkie that year as presidential candidate. Morley said he lost faith in Roosevelt after his Judiciary Reorganization Bill of 1937 to pack the Supreme Court and that Roosevelt had a "debonair attitude of pulling tricks out of a bag."

Morley was one of the founding editors of Human Events in 1944, where he opposed federal overreach and foreign interventionism. However, he left Human Events in 1950 because of its aggressive military stance towards the Soviet Union. He was also one of the founding members of the classical liberal Mont Pelerin Society in 1946.

After resigning from Haverford College, he continued his journalistic work at NBC and for Nation's Business. He published his memoirs, For the Record, in 1977. Other books he published after the war were The Power in the People (1949), The Foreign Policy of the United States (1951) and Freedom and Federalism (1959). Also published, in 1956, is his utopian novel Gumption Island.

References

Sources

Further reading

External links
 American Republic or American Empire Modern Age, Volume 1, Number 1, Summer 1957.
 Sound recordings of speeches by Morley to the Institute for Humane Studies at the Hoover Institution Archives.
 
 Felix Morley: Democracy, Republics, & the General Will Orrin Woodward on Life and Leadership (blog, with photograph)).

1894 births
1982 deaths
20th-century American journalists
20th-century Quakers
American male journalists
American political journalists
American Quakers
Haverford College alumni
Human Events people
Journalists from Pennsylvania
Non-interventionism
Old Right (United States)
American opinion journalists
People from Delaware County, Pennsylvania
Presidents of Haverford College
Pulitzer Prize for Editorial Writing winners
The Washington Post people
20th-century American academics